The 1929 Chicago Maroons football team was an American football team that represented the University of Chicago during the 1929 college football season. In their 38th season under head coach Amos Alonzo Stagg, the Maroons compiled a 7–3 record, finished in ninth place in the Big Ten Conference, and outscored their opponents by a combined total of 130 to 92.

Fritz Crisler was an assistant coach on the team.

Schedule

References

Chicago
Chicago Maroons football seasons
Chicago Maroons football